Somebody's Mother is a 1926 American silent drama film directed by Oscar Apfel and starring Mary Carr, Rex Lease, and Kathryn McGuire.

Synopsis
Mary sells matches on the streets of New York, but unknown to everyone she encounters she is really searching for her son who was kidnapped from her many years ago when he was a young boy.

Cast
 Mary Carr as 	Mary, aka 'Matches' Mary
 Rex Lease as 	Peter
 Mickey McBan as 	Peter, as a Young Boy
 Kathryn McGuire as Peter's Sweetheart
 Sidney Franklin as Foster
 Edward Martindel as Mary's Lawyer

References

Bibliography
 Connelly, Robert B. The Silents: Silent Feature Films, 1910–36, Volume 40, Issue 2. December Press, 1998.
 Munden, Kenneth White. The American Film Institute Catalog of Motion Pictures Produced in the United States, Part 1. University of California Press, 1997.

External links

 

1926 films
1926 drama films
1920s English-language films
American silent feature films
Silent American drama films
Films directed by Oscar Apfel
American black-and-white films
Rayart Pictures films
Films set in New York City
1920s American films